Eragon is a novel written by Christopher Paolini.

Eragon may also refer to several things related to the book:

 Eragon (character), the protagonist
 Eragon (film), a 2006 film adaptation
 Eragon (video game)
 Eragon I, the first dragon rider

See also
 Erigon, ancient Thracian name of the Crna River in the Republic of Macedonia